Dher is one of the backward classes and scheduled castes of India.  They were one of the lowest and despised sections of Hindu out-caste society.
They are primarily found in Andhra Pradesh, Karnataka, Maharashtra and Gujarat. In Southern India, among Dhers there were three principal class of slaves called Holiyas, Yemaru and Paleru. 

In British India, the Dhers live in scattered groups, occupying wretched hovels of foliage, and depending on the chase, fishing, and the carcases of dead animals. Some worked as leather tanner and mostly used to work as slave labor.

References

Dalit communities
Social groups of Karnataka
Social groups of India
Social groups of Madhya Pradesh
Social groups of Andhra Pradesh
Social groups of Maharashtra
Social groups of Gujarat